Heather Buck (1926–2004), born Heather Entwistle, was an English poet.

Life
She was born in 1926 in Kent, England. In 1952, she married Hadley Buck and they had two children. 
During her life, she had many careers, including cartographer for the War Department in London from 1942 to 1945; town planner for Ministry of Town and Country Planning in London from 1945 to 1947, in the Essex County Planning Department in Chelmsford from 1947 to 1949, and for the London City Council from 1949 to 1952. 
She started writing poetry in 1966, after she participated in Jungian analysis.  She died in 2004.

Influences 
Buck identified her major influences as T.S. Eliot, followed by Wallace Stevens and Rainer Rilke.

Works

Poetry 
 The Opposite Direction. London, Outposts Publications, 1971, 
 At the Window. London, Anvil Press, 1982, 
 The Sign of the Water Bearer. London, and Wolfeboro, New Hampshire, Anvil Press, 1987, 
 Psyche Unbound. London, Anvil Press, 1995, 
 Waiting for the Ferry. London, Anvil Press, 1998,

Other 
 T.S. Eliot's Four Quartets (essay). London, Agenda Editions, 1996,

References 

1926 births
2004 deaths
English women poets
People from Kent
20th-century English poets
20th-century English women writers